Small Soldiers is an action video game, based on the film of the same name. Unrelated games were released for the PC and Game Boy. Unlike the 1998 film, the story is set in a fantasy world as opposed to the characters being made out of toys living in the real world.

Gameplay

Single-player
The Commando Elite are trying to eliminate the Gorgonites and destroy their home planet Gorgon. Players take the role of Archer, as he battles against the game's antagonist, Chip Hazard. The player is equipped with a rapid-fire crossbow, which can receive new ammunition types and which has several accuracies and strengths. Players can use turrets and vehicles.

Multiplayer
In multiplayer mode, players can play as either Archer or Chip Hazard. The gameplay is the same as single-player. For Chip Hazard his default weapon is a rapid-fire pistol, which can receive new ammunition types.

There are two game modes in multiplayer mode; frag mode where a player must score five kills before the other player does so and flag Mode; where a player must return all three flags to their base.

Soundtrack
The soundtrack for the game was composed by Michael Giacchino.

Reception

Game Informer gave the game an overall score of 7.25 out of 10, praising the challenging action and easy puzzles but criticizing the gameplay controls, especially when the player gets stuck on invisible barriers concluding it is "fun, but it's nothing to get excited about."

References

External links

Small Soldiers on IGameD.com
Small Soldiers at Gamefaqs

1998 video games
Electronic Arts games
Game Boy games
PlayStation (console) games
THQ games
Video games based on films
DreamWorks Interactive games
Sentient toys in fiction
Tiertex Design Studios games
Video games about toys
Video games scored by Michael Giacchino
Multiplayer and single-player video games
Video games developed in the United States